The State of Haiti was the name of the state in northern Haiti. It was created on 17 October 1806 following the assassination of Emperor Jacques I and the overthrow of the First Empire of Haiti. The northern State of Haiti was ruled by Henri Christophe originally as Provisional Chief of the Haitian Government from 17 October 1806 until 17 February 1807 when he became President of the State of Haiti. The 1807 constitution for the State of Haiti made the post of president a position for life with the president having the power to appoint his successor. On 28 March 1811 President Henri was proclaimed King Henri I, thereby dissolving the State of Haiti and creating the Kingdom of Haiti.

Following the assassination of Emperor Jacques I, the country was split. Parallel with the government of Christophe in the north, Alexandre Pétion, a free person of color, ruled over the south of the country as President of the Republic of Haiti until his death in 1818. He was succeeded by Jean-Pierre Boyer, who reunited the two parts of the nation after the deaths of Henri I and Henri I's son, Jacques-Victor Henry, in 1820.

History 
From 1791 to 1804, the Haitian revolution against the French colonists raged. After the failure of the French expedition of 1803, General Jean-Jacques Dessalines proclaimed Haiti's independence.

On 8 October 1804, Dessalines is crowned emperor in Cap-Haitian under the name of Jacques I.

But very quickly, some generals, ambitious to take power, set up a plot against the emperor who was finally killed by General Alexandre Pétion's men in an ambush on 17 October 1806, at the Pont-Rouge (at the entrance to Port-au-Prince), betrayed by one of his battalion leaders.

After that, his generals marched on the capital, abolished the Empire and drove out the imperial family, which had to go into exile. Alexandre Pétion proclaims the Republic and becomes president. But another general, Henri Christophe, seceded and took control of northern Haiti where he established a separatist government, the Northern State.

President of the Northern Republic, then president and generalissimo of the land and sea forces of the State of Northern Haiti from 1807, Henri Christophe wanted to legitimize his power as Dessalines had done by re-establishing the empire. In conflict with the southern republic of Pétion, he managed, after several battles, to secure the borders of his new state.

During this period, the French who remained in the eastern part of the island were defeated by the Hispanic-Creole inhabitants, under the command of Juan Sánchez Ramírez, at the battle of Palo Hincado on 7 November 1808. The French surrender in the eastern part of the island took place in Santo Domingo on 9 July 1809. The authorities then re-established the Spanish colony.

Having established a certain stability, Christophe established a constitutional monarchy with him as monarch. He became King of Haiti on 28 March 1811, under the name of Henry I. On 2 June 1811, he was crowned by the Grand Archbishop Jean-Baptiste-Joseph Brelle.

See also 
 Kingdom of Haiti
 First Empire of Haiti
 Second Empire of Haiti

References

External links 
Constitution of the State of Haiti
Flags of the World: Haiti
Worldstatesmen

State of Haiti
State of Haiti
1800s in Haiti
1810s in Haiti
1806 establishments in Haiti
State of Haiti
States and territories established in 1806
States and territories disestablished in 1811